The 2004 All-Ireland Minor Hurling Championship was the 74th staging of the All-Ireland Minor Hurling Championship since its establishment by the Gaelic Athletic Association in 1928. The championship began on 27 March 2004 and ended on 19 September 2004.

Kilkenny entered the championship as defending champions.

On 19 September 2004, Galway won the championship following a 0-16 to 1-12 defeat of Kilkenny in the All-Ireland final replay at O'Connor Park. This was their sixth All-Ireland title overall and their first title since 2000.

Tipperary's Darragh Hickey was the championship's top scorer with 4-29.

Results

Leinster Minor Hurling Championship

Group stage

Quarter-finals

Semi-finals

Final

Munster Minor Hurling Championship

First round

Playoffs

Semi-finals

Final

Ulster Minor Hurling Championship

Semi-final

Final

All-Ireland Minor Hurling Championship

Quarter-finals

Semi-finals

Finals

Championship statistics

Top scorers

Top scorers overall

Top scorers in a single game

References

External links
 All-Ireland Minor Hurling Championship: Roll Of Honour

Minor
All-Ireland Minor Hurling Championship